Founded in 2006, Genesis is a UK bike brand manufacturing road, urban, youth and mountain models.

Genesis is distributed by Sportline UK which is owned by H Young Holdings.

History 
The first Genesis bike was produced under the Ridgeback brand as the Day One model in 2001. Due to its popularity, Genesis became a label in its own right in 2006.

Over ten years the range expanded beyond commuter bikes to include road, mountain, cyclo-cross, gravel, kids and fat bikes.

Genesis bikes became renowned for their use of steel tubing and ethos for function over form.

The bikes have been designed by James Olsen (2005-2011), Dom Thomas (2011-2013) and Albert Steward (2013-2015).

Croix de Fer 

In 2009 Genesis launched its most successful model, the Croix de Fer. The steel drop bar model, which could take wide tyres, guards and disc brakes was an early incarnation of the burgeoning gravel bike.

Its adventurous credentials were proven in 2010 as Vin Cox set the Guinness World Record for the fastest circumnavigation of the globe by bicycle.

The Montane Icemen (Pete Sissons and Paul Cosgrove) underlined the bikes capabilities as they used a pair of Croix de Fers to circumnavigate the 1600-mile coastline of Iceland in 14 days.

In 2014, actor Harrison Ford was pictured riding a Croix de Fer in London, while filming for Star Wars: The Force Awakens.

Vin Cox 

The popularity of the Croix de Fer was helped in part by Vin Cox using a Genesis Croix de Fer when claiming the Guinness World Record for the fastest circumnavigation of the globe by bicycle in 2010

Zero 
In 2014, Genesis made its first production carbon fibre bike for the Madison Genesis road racing team – the Zero was subsequently updated in September 2015, with a lower weight and improved fork.

2016 model list 
Road (sportive)

·     Equilibrium – steel road bike

·     Equilibrium Disc– steel or titanium road bike, disc brake

·     Delta – aluminium road bike

·     Flyer – chromoly road bike, singlespeed

Road (performance)

·     Zero – carbon road race bike

·     Volare – steel road race bike

Adventure (multisport)

·     Datum – carbon gravel bike

·     Croix de Fer – steel or titanium gravel bike

·     CdA – aluminium gravel bike

·     Tour de Fer – chromoly touring bike, flat bar

·     Vagabond – chromoly touring gravel bike

Mountain (and trail)

·     Longitude – chromoly mountain bike, rigid

·     Caribou – chromoly fatbike, rigid

·     Tarn – chromoly mountain bike, hardtail, 27.5+/29

·     High Latitude – chromoly mountain bike, hardtail, 29er

·     Latitude – chromoly mountain bike, hardtail, 27.5

·     Core – aluminium mountain bike, hardtail, 27.5

Urban (cross and utility)

·     Day One – chromoly commuter bike, drop bar

·     Smithfield – chromoly commuter bike, flat bar

·     Borough – chromoly commuter bike, flat bar

Youth

·     Beta

·     Alpha

·     Caribou Jr

·     Core 26

·     Core 24

Sponsorship 

Bike supplier and title sponsor to the Madison Genesis road racing team, since 2013.

References

External links
Official website
H. Young Holdings

British brands
Cycle manufacturers of the United Kingdom
Mountain bike manufacturers